Frederick Charles Weaver (10 March 1878 – 29 December 1949) was an English cricketer. Weaver's batting and bowling styles are unknown. He was born at Gloucester, Gloucestershire.

Weaver made his first-class debut for Gloucestershire against Yorkshire in the 1897 County Championship. He next played first-class cricket for the county in the 1900 County Championship, making two appearances against Nottinghamshire and Essex. He made a further first-class appearance in the 1901 County Championship against Yorkshire, before making a final first-class appearance in the 1909 County Championship against Northamptonshire. In his five matches, he took 8 wickets at a bowling average of 22.12, with best figures of 5/63, which came against Nottinghamshire. With the bat, he scored 31 runs at an average of 4.42, with a high score of 18 not out,

He died at Limpley Stoke, Wiltshire, on 29 December 1949.

References

External links
Frederick Weaver at ESPNcricinfo
Frederick Weaver at CricketArchive

1878 births
1949 deaths
Cricketers from Gloucester
English cricketers
Gloucestershire cricketers